Jean-Gaston Darboux FAS MIF FRS FRSE (14 August 1842 – 23 February 1917) was a French mathematician.

Life
According to his birth certificate, he was born in Nîmes in France on 14 August 1842, at 1 am. However, probably due to the midnight birth, Darboux himself usually reported his own birthday as 13 August, e.g. in his filled form for Légion d'Honneur.

His parents were François Darboux, businessman of mercery, and Alix Gourdoux. The father died when Gaston was 7. His mother undertook the mercery business with great courage, and insisted that her children receive good education. Gaston had a younger brother, Louis, who taught mathematics at the Lycée Nîmes for almost his entire life.

He studied at the Nîmes Lycée and the Montpellier Lycée before being accepted as the top qualifier at the École normale supérieure in 1861, and received his PhD there in 1866. His thesis, written under the direction of Michel Chasles, was titled Sur les surfaces orthogonales. During his studies at the ENS, he also took lectures in Sorbonne University and Collège de France.

In 1870, he co-founded the journal Bulletin des sciences mathématiques et astronomiques, called "Darboux's Journal" by his contemporary mathematicians. The editorial board was also formed by the mathematicians Paul Émile Appell, Émile Borel, Jacques Hadamard and Amedeo Guillet, with Darboux in the role of President. The publishing house was the Henry Gauthier-Villars et Cle Éditeurs, located in Paris.

In 1872, Darboux married the Beauvaisian milliner Amélie Célina Carbonnier (1848-1911), daughter of Charles Louis Carbonnier, tailor, and Marie Victorine Anastase Hènocq. He and Célina had two children, Jean-Gaston (1870-1921), who was born at the time of the Siege of Paris and later became a marine zoologist at the Faculty of Science in Marseille, and Anaïs Berthe Lucie (1873-1970).

He participated in the foundation of the École normale supérieure de jeunes filles in 1880, an institute that aimed at training female educators and ran parallel to the École normale supérieure on rue d'Ulm. Its first director was Julie Favre.

In 1884, Darboux was elected to the Académie des Sciences.

Darboux made several important contributions to geometry and mathematical analysis (see, for example, linear PDEs). He was a biographer of Henri Poincaré and he edited the Selected Works of Joseph Fourier.

Among his students were Émile Borel, Élie Cartan, Édouard Goursat, Émile Picard, Gheorghe Țițeica and Stanisław Zaremba.

In 1900, he was appointed the Academy's permanent secretary of its Mathematics section.

In 1902, he was elected to the Royal Society and the American Philosophical Society; in 1916, he received the Sylvester Medal from the Society.  In 1908, he was a plenary speaker at the International Congress of Mathematicians in Rome.
He continued to contribute to the French Bulletin des sciences mathématiques, even after 1916.

Named in his honour 
There are many things named after him:

 Darboux basis
 Darboux chart
 Darboux cubic
 Darboux derivative
 Darboux equation
 Darboux frame
 Darboux integral
 Darboux net invariants
 Darboux or Goursat problem
 Darboux transformation
 Darboux vector
 Darboux's problem
 Darboux's theorem in symplectic geometry
 Darboux's theorem in real analysis, related to the intermediate value theorem
 Darboux's formula
 Christoffel–Darboux identity
 Christoffel–Darboux formula
 Euler–Darboux equation
 Darboux–Froda's theorem
 Euler–Poisson–Darboux equation
 Laplace–Darboux transformations

Work

Papers and essays (incomplete list) 
 1870. Sur les équations aux dérivées partielles du second ordre Annales scientifiques de l’É.N.S. 1re série, tome 7 (1870), p. 163-173 
 1871. Sur la représentation des surfaces algébriques Bulletin des sciences mathématiques et astronomiques, tome 2 (1871), p. 155-158
 1872. Mémoire sur les surfaces cyclides Annales scientifiques de l’É.N.S. 2e série, tome 1 (1872), p. 273-292
 1872. Sur les relations entre les groupes de points, de cercles et de sphères dans le plan et dans l’espace Annales scientifiques de l’É.N.S. 2e série, tome 1 (1872), p. 323-392
 1872. Sur un théorème relatif à la continuité des fonctions Bulletin des sciences mathématiques et astronomiques, tome 3 (1872), p. 307-313
 1875. Mémoire sur les fonctions discontinues Annales scientifiques de l’É.N.S. 2e série, tome 4 (1875), p. 57-112. In it were introduced the Darboux integral (based on the limit of upper and lower integrals) and Darboux's theorem in analysis. 
 1875. Sur la composition des forces en statique Bulletin des sciences mathématiques et astronomiques, tome 9 (1875), p. 281-288
 1890. Sur le déplacement d’une figure invariable Annales scientifiques de l’É.N.S. 3e série, tome 7 (1890), p. 323-326

Books
1873. Sur une classe remarquable de courbes et de surfaces algébriques et sur la théorie des imaginaires. Gauthier-Villars.

Darboux's contribution to the differential geometry of surfaces appears in the four-volume collection of studies he published between 1887 and 1896; see links below for access to these texts.

1887–96. Leçons sur la théorie générale des surfaces et les applications géométriques du calcul infinitésimal. Gauthier-Villars:
Vol. 1. The Darboux frame is introduced in Section 4 of this volume.
Vol. 2.
Vol. 3.
Vol. 4.
1898. Leçons sur les systèmes orthogonaux et les coordonnées curvilignes. Tome I. Gauthier-Villars.

See also
Envelope theorem

Notes

References

External links

1842 births
1917 deaths
19th-century French mathematicians
20th-century French mathematicians
French geometers
Differential geometers
Members of the French Academy of Sciences
Corresponding members of the Saint Petersburg Academy of Sciences
Foreign Members of the Royal Society
Foreign associates of the National Academy of Sciences
École Normale Supérieure alumni
People from Nîmes
Lycée Louis-le-Grand teachers
Members of the Royal Society of Sciences in Uppsala